Scuttling is the deliberate sinking of a ship. Scuttling may be performed to dispose of an abandoned, old, or captured vessel, to prevent the vessel from becoming a navigation hazard, as an act of self-destruction to prevent the ship from being captured by an enemy force (or, in the case of a vessel engaged in illegal activities, by the authorities), as a blockship to restrict navigation through a channel or within a harbor, to provide an artificial reef for divers and marine life, or to alter the flow of rivers.

Notable historical examples

Skuldelev ships (around 1070) 
The Skuldelev ships, five Viking ships, were sunk to prevent attacks from the sea on the Danish city of Roskilde. The scuttling blocked a major waterway, redirecting ships to a smaller one that required considerable local knowledge.

Cog near Kampen (early 15th century) 
In 2012, a cog preserved from the keel up to the decks in the silt was discovered alongside two smaller vessels in the river IJssel in the city of Kampen, in the Netherlands. The ship, dating from the early 15th century, was suspected to have been deliberately sunk into the river to influence its current.

Hernán Cortés (1519)
The Spanish conquistador Hernán Cortés, who led the first expedition that resulted in the fall of the Aztec Empire, ordered his men to strip and scuttle his fleet to prevent the secretly planned return to Cuba by those loyal to Cuban Governor Diego Velázquez de Cuéllar. Their success would have halted his inland march and conquest of the Aztec Empire.

HMS Sapphire (1696)
HMS Sapphire was a 32-gun, fifth-rate sailing frigate of the Royal Navy in Newfoundland Colony to protect the English migratory fishery. The vessel was trapped in Bay Bulls harbour by four French naval vessels led by Jacques-François de Brouillan. To avoid its capture, the English scuttled the vessel on 11 September 1696.

HMS Endeavour (1778)
HMS Endeavour was Captain James Cook's ship upon which he discovered Australia. After being sold into private hands, she was finally scuttled in a blockade of Narragansett Bay, Rhode Island in 1778.

Siege of Yorktown (1781)
The British sank one ship on 10 October 1781 to prevent it from being captured by the French fleet. Furthermore, the York River, while protected by the French Navy, also contained a few scuttled ships, which were meant to serve as a blockade should any British ships enter the river.

Chesapeake Bay Flotilla (1814)
During the War of 1812, Commodore Joshua Barney, of the U.S. Navy, Chesapeake Bay Flotilla, sank all nineteen of his fighting vessels, to prevent them from being captured by the British, as he and his men marched, inland, in the unsuccessful defense of Washington D.C.

Jan van Speijk (1831)
During the Belgian war of independence, Dutch gunboat commander Jan van Speijk came under attack from a mob of Antwerp labourers. When they forced him and his crew to surrender, he ignited a barrel of gunpowder, thus sinking his ship and killing himself and most of the crew. Van Speijk went on to become a national hero in The Netherlands.

Russian Black Sea Fleet in Sevastopol (1854)

During the Crimean War, in anticipation of the siege of Sevastopol, the Russians scuttled ships of the Black Sea Fleet to protect the harbour, to use their naval cannon as additional artillery, and to free up the ships' crews as marines. Those ships that were deliberately sunk included Grand Duke Constantine, City of Paris (both with 120 guns), Brave, Empress Maria, and Chesme.

USS Merrimack/CSS Virginia (1861)

In April 1861, the United States Navy steam frigate  was among several ships Union forces set afire or scuttled at the Gosport Navy Yard  (now Norfolk Naval Shipyard) in Portsmouth, Virginia, to keep them from falling into Confederate hands at the outbreak of the American Civil War. The unsuccessful attempt at scuttling Merrimack enabled the Confederate States Navy to raise and rebuild her as the broadside ironclad CSS Virginia. Shortly after her famous engagement with the U.S Navy monitor  in the Battle of Hampton Roads in March 1862, the Confederates scuttled Virginia to keep her from being captured by Union forces.

Stone Fleet (1861–1862) 

In December 1861 and January 1862, Union forces scuttled a number of former whalers and other merchant ships in an attempt to block access to Confederate ports during the American Civil War. Loaded with stone before being scuttled, the scuttled ships were known as the "Stone Fleet." Those scuttled in December 1861 sometimes are called the "First Stone Fleet," while those sunk in January 1862 sometimes are termed the "Second Stone Fleet."

Peruvian fleet at El Callao (1881)

During the War of the Pacific, as Chilean troops entered Lima and El Callao, the Peruvian naval officer Germán Astete ordered the whole Peruvian fleet to be scuttled to prevent capture by Chile.

USS Merrimac (1898)

During the Spanish–American War, a volunteer crew of United States Navy personnel attempted to scuttle the collier  in the entrance to the harbor at Santiago de Cuba in Cuba on the night of 2–3 June 1898 in an attempt to trap the Spanish Navy squadron of Vice Admiral Manuel de la Cámara y Libermoore in port there. The attempt failed when she came under fire by Spanish ships and fortifications and sank without blocking the entrance.

Port Arthur (1904–1905) 

In 1904, during the Russo-Japanese War, the Imperial Japanese Navy made three attempts to block the entrance to the Imperial Russian Navy base at Port Arthur, Manchuria, China, by scuttling transports. Although the Japanese scuttled five transports on 23 February, four on 27 March, and eight on 3 May, none of the attacks succeeded in blocking the entrance. The Russians also scuttled four steamers at the entrance in March 1904 in an attempt to defend the harbor from Japanese intrusion.

During the siege of Port Arthur, the Russians scuttled the surviving ships of their Pacific Squadron that were trapped in port at Port Arthur in late 1904 and early January 1905 to prevent their capture intact by the Japanese.

SS Kaiser Wilhelm der Grosse (1914) 
In August 1914, SS Kaiser Wilhelm der Grosse was requisitioned by the Kaiserliche Marine and converted into an auxiliary cruiser, assigned to commerce raiding in the Atlantic. She was fitted with six 10.5 cm (4 inch) guns and two 37 mm guns. After sparing two passenger ships because they were carrying many women and children, she sank two freighters before she herself was sunk on 26 August 1914. She was ambushed while refuelling off the shore of the then Spanish colony of Río de Oro in western Africa by the old British 6-inch gunned cruiser . Badly outgunned, the ship eventually ran out of ammunition.  The crew abandoned and scuttled her.  British sources at the time claimed that Kaiser Wilhelm der Grosse sank because of the damage inflicted by Highflyer.

SMS Dresden (1915)  
In December 1914,  was the only German warship to escape destruction in the Battle of the Falkland Islands. She eluded her British pursuers for several more months, until she put into Más a Tierra in March 1915. Her engines were worn out and she had almost no coal left for her boilers. There, she was trapped by British cruisers, which violated Chilean neutrality and opened fire on the ship. Dresdens Executive Officer – the future Admiral Wilhelm Canaris – negotiated with the British and bought time for his crew to scuttle the Dresden.

Zeebrugge Raid (1918) 
The Zeebrugge Raid involved three outdated British cruisers chosen to serve as  blockships in the German-held Belgian port of Bruges-Zeebrugge from which German U-boat operations threatened British shipping. Thetis, Intrepid and Iphigenia were filled with concrete then sent to block a critical canal. Heavy defensive fire caused the Thetis to scuttle prematurely; the other two cruisers sank themselves successfully in the narrowest part of the canal. Within three days, however, the Germans had broken through the western bank of the canal to create a shallow detour for their submarines to move past the blockships at high tide.

German fleet at Scapa Flow (1919)

In 1919, over 50 warships of the German High Seas Fleet were scuttled by their crews at Scapa Flow in the north of Scotland, following the deliverance of the fleet as part of the terms of the German surrender. Rear Admiral Ludwig von Reuter ordered the sinkings, denying the majority of the ships to the Allies. Von Reuter was made a prisoner-of-war in Britain but his act of defiance was celebrated in Germany. Though most of the fleet was subsequently salvaged by engineer Ernest Cox, a number of warships (including three battleships) remain, making the area very popular amongst undersea diving enthusiasts.

Washington Naval Treaty (1922)

Under the terms of the Washington Naval Treaty of 1922, the great naval powers were required to limit the size of their battlefleets, resulting in the disposal of some older or incomplete capital ships. During 1924 and 1925, the treaty resulted in the scuttling of the Royal Australian Navy battlecruiser  and the incomplete Imperial Japanese Navy battleship Tosa, while four old Japanese battleships, the Royal Navy battleship , and the incomplete United States Navy battleship  all were disposed of as targets.

SS Palo Alto (1929)
SS Palo Alto was a concrete ship built as a tanker at the end of  World War I. Completed too late to see war service, she was mothballed until 1929, when she was intentionally grounded off a Northern California beach at Aptos, California, becoming part of a pleasure pier entertainment complex.

Admiral Graf Spee (1939)
Following the Battle of the River Plate the damaged German pocket battleship  sought refuge in the port of Montevideo. Langsdorff shot himself three days later.

San Giorgio at Tobruk (1941)
When British and Commonwealth land forces attacked Tobruk on 21 January 1941, the Italian cruiser San Giorgio turned its guns against the attacking force, repelling an attack by tanks. As British forces were entering Tobruk, San Giorgio was scuttled at 4:15 AM on 22 January. San Giorgio was awarded the Gold Medal of Military Valor for her actions in the defence of Tobruk. The ship was salvaged in 1952, but while being towed to Italy, her tow rope failed and she sank in heavy seas.

Blockade of Massawa (1941) 
As the Allies advanced toward Eritrea during their East African Campaign in World War II, Mario Bonetti—the Italian commander of the Red Sea Flotilla based at Massawa—realized that the British would overrun his harbor. In the first week of April 1941, he began to destroy the harbor's facilities and ruin its usefulness to the Allies. Bonetti ordered the sinking of two large floating dry docks and supervised the calculated scuttling of eighteen large commercial ships in the mouths of the north Naval Harbor, the central Commercial Harbor and the main South Harbor. This blocked navigation in and out. He also had a large floating crane scuttled. These actions rendered the harbor useless by 8 April 1941, when Bonetti surrendered it to the British. Scuttled ships included the German steamers Liebenfels, Frauenfels, Crefeld, Gera and Oliva. Also scuttled were the Italian steamers Adua, Brenta, Arabia, Romolo Gessi, Vesuvio, XXIII Marzo, Antonia C., Riva Ligure, Clelia Campenella, Prometeo and the Italian tanker Giove. The largest scuttled vessel was the 11,760-ton Colombo, an Italian steamer. Thirteen coastal steamers and small naval vessels were also scuttled.

The British seized the harbor and initiated marine salvage operations to restore navigation in and out. Divers sealed the hulls underwater, and air was pumped in to float the hulls. The divers defused a booby trap in Brenta, which contained an armed naval mine sitting on three torpedo warheads in the hold. Another danger was Regia Marina minelayer Ostia, which had been sunk by the Royal Air Force with several of its mines still racked.

Though a civilian contractor was retained to clear a navigable passage through the wrecks, it was not until a year later that headway was made in the effort to return Massawa to military duties. U.S. Navy Commander Edward Ellsberg arrived in April 1942 with a salvage crew and a small collection of specialized tools and began methodically correcting the damage. His salvage efforts yielded significant results in just 5½ weeks. On 8 May 1942, SS Koritza, an armed Greek steamer, had drydocked for cleaning and minor hull repairs. Many of the harbor's sunken ships were patched by divers, refloated, repaired and taken into service. Ostia and Brenta were successfully salvaged, despite their armed mines. All of this occurred while the civil contractor struggled and failed to refloat one ship.

Bismarck (1941)
In 1941, the battleship Bismarck, heavily damaged by the Royal Navy, leaking fuel, listing, unable to steer and with no effective weapons, but still afloat and with engines running, was scuttled by its crew to avoid capture. This was supported by survivors' reports in Pursuit: the Sinking of the Bismarck, by Ludovic Kennedy, 1974 and by a later examination of the wreck itself by Dr. Robert Ballard in 1989. A later, more advanced examination found torpedoes had penetrated the second deck, normally always above water and only possible on an already sinking ship, thus further supporting that scuttling had made the final torpedoing redundant.

Coral Sea and Midway (1942)
After the Battles of the Coral Sea and Midway, the heavily damaged American aircraft carrier Lexington and the Japanese carriers Hiryū, Sōryū, Akagi, and Kaga were all scuttled to prevent their preservation and use by their respective enemies.

French fleet at Toulon (1942)

In November 1942, in an operation codenamed Case Anton, Nazi German forces occupied the so-called "Free Zone" in response to the Allied landing in North Africa. On 27 November they reached Toulon, where the majority of the French Navy was anchored. To avoid capture by the Nazis (Operation Lila), the French admirals-in-command (Laborde and Marquis) decided to scuttle the 230,000 tonne fleet, most notably, the battleships Dunkerque and Strasbourg. Eighty percent of the fleet was utterly destroyed, all of the capital ships proving impossible to repair.  Legally, the scuttling of the fleet was allowed under the terms of the 1940 Armistice with Germany.

Danish fleet (1943)
Anticipating a German seizure of all units of the Danish Navy as part of Operation Safari, mostly in Copenhagen but also at other harbours and at sea in Danish waters, the Danish Admiralty had instructed its captains to resist, short of outright fighting, any German attempts to assume control over their vessels, by scuttling if escape to Sweden was not possible and suitable preparations were made.  Of the fifty-two vessels in the Danish Navy on 29 August, two were in Greenland, thirty-two were scuttled, four reached Sweden and fourteen were taken undamaged by the Germans. Nine Danish sailors lost their lives and ten were wounded. Subsequently, major parts of the Naval personnel were interned for a period.

Allied landing in Normandy (1944)
Old ships code-named "Corn cobs" were sunk to form a protective reef for the Mulberry harbours at Arromanches and Omaha Beach for the Normandy landings. The sheltered waters created by these scuttled ships were called "Gooseberries" and protected the harbours so transport ships could unload without being hampered by waves.

Operation Deadlight (1945–1946)
 

Of the 156 German submarines ("U-boats") surrendered to the Allies at the end of World War II, 116 were scuttled by the Royal Navy in Operation Deadlight. Plans called for them to be scuttled in three areas in the North Atlantic Ocean west of Ireland, but 56 of the submarines sank before reaching the designated areas due to their poor material condition. Most of the submarines were sunk by gunfire rather than with explosive charges. The first sinking took place on 17 November 1945 and the last on 11 February 1946.

Japanese submarines (1946)
To prevent a Soviet inspection team from examining surrendered Imperial Japanese Navy submarines after World War II, the United States Navy conducted Operation Road's End, in which it scuttled 24 of the submarines in the East China Sea off Fukue Island on 1 April 1946. Nine more Japanese submarines followed on 5 April, and another six went down by early May. In addition, U.S. Navy submarines sank four surrendered Japanese submarines as targets in the Pacific Ocean near Hawaii in May and June 1946, and the Royal Australian Navy sank six or seven (sources differ) surrendered Japanese submarines in the Seto Inland Sea on 8 May 1946 in Operation Bottom.

Operation Crossroads aftermath (1946–1951)

The July 1946 atomic bomb tests at Bikini Atoll in Operation Crossroads left the United States Navy with a large number of damaged target ships contaminated with radioactivity. Twenty-seven of these ships – three battleships, two heavy cruisers, eleven destroyers, four submarines, and seven attack transports – were scuttled in the Pacific Ocean between February and November 1948, while the light aircraft carrier  was scuttled on 29 January 1951.

Contemporary era 

Today, ships (and other objects of similar size) are sometimes sunk to help form artificial reefs, as was done with the former  in 2006. It is also common for military organizations to use old ships as targets, in war games, or for various other experiments. As an example, the decommissioned aircraft carrier  was subjected to surface and underwater explosions in 2005 as part of classified research to help design the next generation of carriers (the ), before being sunk with demolition charges.

Ships are increasingly being scuttled as a method of disposal. The economic benefit of scuttling a ship includes removal of ongoing operational expense to keep the vessel seaworthy. Controversy surrounds the practice. Notable actions against the practice include the USS Oriskany, which was scuttled with 700 pounds of PCBs remaining on board as a component in cable insulation,  contravening the Stockholm Convention on safe disposal of persistent organic pollutants, which has zero tolerance for PCB dumping in marine environments. The planned scuttling of the Australian frigate  at Avoca Beach, New South Wales in March 2010 was placed on hold after resident action groups aired concerns about possible impact on the area's tides and that the removal of dangerous substances from the ship was not thorough enough. Further cleanup work on the hulk was ordered, and despite further attempts to delay, Adelaide was scuttled on 13 April 2011.

Scuttled ships have been used as conveyance for dangerous materials. In the late 1960s, the United States Army scuttled SS Corporal Eric G. Gibson and SS Mormactern with VX nerve gas rockets aboard as part of Operation CHASE — "CHASE" being Pentagon shorthand for "Cut Holes and Sink 'Em." Other ships have been "chased" containing mustard agents, bombs, land mines, and radioactive waste.

In Somalian waters, pirate ships captured are scuttled. Most nations have little interest in prosecuting the pirates, thus this is usually the only repercussion.

In March 2022, Ukraine was forced to scuttle the Ukrainian frigate Hetman Sahaidachny, a Krivak-class frigate, due to encroaching Russian offensive operations that threatened to capture the frigate.

In February 2023, the Brazilian Navy scuttled the decommissioned aircraft carrier São Paulo into the Atlantic Ocean, following the rejections of injunctions from the Ministry of the Environment and the Federal Public Ministry.

In popular culture 
The term scuttling is also used in science fiction to describe intentionally destroying a spacecraft. For example, in The Expanse, this is done by intentionally overloading the ship's reactor.

Notes

Bibliography 
 

Nautical terminology
Maritime history
Ship disposal
 
Artificial reefs